Armando Chacón (7 August 1914 – ?) was a Salvadoran football player and manager.  He is the father of former FAS, Atlético Marte and Sonsonate midfielder in the 1960s , Armando Chacón, and is often referred to as "Armando Chacón Senior" when there is a chance of confusion between the two.

Club career
Nicknamed El Tamarindo, he was one of the first Salvadoran players to play abroad, playing for Universidad Católica in Chile.  He also played club football for the now defunct C.D. 33 in the Primera División de Fútbol de El Salvador winning the 1937 and 1938 league titles with them.

International career
On March 28, 1935 he made his international debut  in El Salvador's second group stage match at the 1935 Central American Games against Honduras, where he also got his first goal, scoring the third in a 3-4 loss.
Chacon scored  goals for the El Salvador national football team from 1935 to 1943. He represented his country at the 1935 Central American Games.

Manager career
After retiring as a player Chacón became a coach, he was the first ever coach of Salvadoran powerhouse club C.D. FAS and also coached C.D. Dragón.
He went on to win a title with Once Municipal in the 1948/1949 season, the club's first title and up until 2006 their only one.

Honours
International
Central American and Caribbean Games Bronze Medal (1): 1935

References

Year of death missing
Salvadoran footballers
El Salvador international footballers
Salvadoran expatriate footballers
Club Deportivo Universidad Católica footballers
Expatriate footballers in Chile
Salvadoran expatriate sportspeople in Chile
Salvadoran football managers
1914 births
C.D. FAS managers
Central American and Caribbean Games bronze medalists for El Salvador
Competitors at the 1935 Central American and Caribbean Games
Association football midfielders
Central American and Caribbean Games medalists in football